Shepparton Airport  is located south of Shepparton, Victoria, Australia on the Goulburn Valley Highway.

See also
 List of airports in Victoria

References

Airports in Victoria (Australia)
Shepparton